"Night Shift" is a song by American indie rock musician Lucy Dacus. It was released as the lead single from her album Historian on December 12, 2017.

Background 
Dacus described the song as, "The only breakup song I've ever written." It was inspired by her relationship with her former bassist, with whom she broke up after finishing the tour for her previous album No Burden. She said that her decision to include it as the opening track on the album was:Very deliberate! A breakup song is so immediately relatable. A first genuine heartbreak is a look into reimagining what your life is going to look like. If you accommodate somebody else and you think they’re going to be part of your life and then they’re not, you have to reform. The rest of the album has that reforming quality — having the rug pulled out from underneath you, and coming back.

Reception 
"Night Shift" was released to critical acclaim. Andrew Marantz of The New Yorker described it as "a cathartic, bridge-burning, no-fucks-given breakup song." Julien Luebbers of The Spokesman-Review wrote that the song was "a vibrant example of linear construction, the song building from soft guitar and vocals to headbanging passion and some seriously impressive singing," and Layla Halabian of The Fader named it, "One of the great breakup songs of all time." James Rettig of Stereogum called it "A six-and-a-half-minute sprawl that earns every one of those seconds," and, "A marvel of songwriting," while Bob Boilen of NPR Music's program All Songs Considered declared it "One of 2018's great songs." The song has been praised for its pacing, lyricism, and instrumentation that lies between confessional songwriting and punk. Gabbie Nirenburg of independent music magazine No Ripcord was more mixed in her assessment, saying it "has a memorable chorus and bridge, but it is entirely too predictable to stand up to Dacus’s earlier work."

In 2019, NPR Music listeners picked "Night Shift" as one of the top 25 songs of the decade.

Music Video 
At the time of the song's release, Dacus or her label did not have the time or funding available to produce a music video. Five years on from Historian's release, in 2023, Dacus worked with Jane Schoenbrun, Jasmin Savoy Brown, and others to release a video featuring Dacus as a hotel employee who stumbles across a fantastical party.

Year-end lists

Decade-end lists

References 

Indie rock songs
2017 songs
Matador Records singles
Lucy Dacus albums